Crurithyris is an extinct genus of brachiopod belonging to the order Spiriferida and family Ambocoeliidae.

Species 
C. aquilonia Stehli and Grant, 1971
C. arcuata Girty, 1910
C. calendae Johnson 1971
C. clannyana King 1848
C. expansa Dunbar and Condra, 1932
C. extumida Jin and Ye, 1979
C. inflata Schnur, 1853
C. longa Liao, 1980
C. longirostris Cooper and Grant, 1976
C. longtanica Jin and Hu, 1978
C. major Cooper and Grant, 1976
C. muliensis Xu, 1978
C. opalinus Termier and Termier, 1977
C. parva Weller 1899
C. planoconvexa Shumard, 1855
C. sulcata Stehli, 1954
C. telleri Schellwien, 1900
C. tianshengqiaoensis Feng, 1978
C. uralica Stepanov and Kalashnikov, 1998
C. urei Fleming, 1828
C. wampensis Mills and Langenheim Jr., 1987

References 

Paleozoic life
Spiriferida